Vancouver station is an Amtrak intercity rail station in Vancouver, Washington, United States. The station is served by four daily round trips of the Cascades, the daily Coast Starlight, and the daily Portland section of the Empire Builder.

Vancouver station is located in a wye between the Fallbridge Subdivision and Seattle Subdivision, just north Burlington Northern Railroad Bridge 9.6 over the Columbia River. A side platform and narrow island platform on the west side of the station building serve the Cascades and Coast Starlight on the Seattle Subdivision, while a side platform to the east serves the Empire Builder on the Fallbridge Subdivision.

Designed by Kennewick-based architect Francis A. Swingle, the station was constructed in 1908 by the Spokane, Portland and Seattle Railway (a subsidiary of the Northern Pacific Railroad) to serve trains using the new Columbia River bridge. Service was transferred to Amtrak in 1971. A partial restoration of the station building took place in 1988, followed by a full renovation in 2008–09.

References

External links

Amtrak stations in Washington (state)
Railway stations in the United States opened in 1908
Buildings and structures in Vancouver, Washington
Transportation in Vancouver, Washington
Former Northern Pacific Railway stations in Washington (state)
1908 establishments in Washington (state)
Transportation buildings and structures in Clark County, Washington
Former Great Northern Railway (U.S.) stations
Former Union Pacific Railroad stations in Washington (state)
Former Spokane, Portland and Seattle Railway stations